Meole Brace School is a coeducational secondary school in the suburb of Meole Brace, Shrewsbury, England. It is one of two state-funded secondary schools in South Shrewsbury and serves a wide catchment area which includes Meole Brace, areas of Belle Vue and Radbrook, as well as Bayston Hill and some rural settlements south of Shrewsbury.

It previously held Science College specialist status and was awarded the Sportsmark by the Sports Council. Ofsted rated the school "Good" in 2015, paying special attention to the above average results in Religious Studies, Geography, Drama and Modern Foreign Languages at GCSE level. The school also has Ofsted "Good" ratings in every category.

Previously a community school administered by Shropshire Council, in January 2019 Meole Brace School converted to academy status. The school is now sponsored by the Central Shropshire Academy Trust.

As Meole Brace School does not have a sixth form, students transfer to Shrewsbury Sixth Form College, Shrewsbury College or a private school. Still, Meole Brace - sometimes abbreviated to MBF - is the largest secondary school within Shrewsbury.

Notable former pupils 
Nick Beighton, Paralympic bronze medallist 
Joe Hart, footballer
Adrian Spillett, 1998 BBC Young Musician of the Year winner
Mason Springthorpe, footballer
Tom Clarke, BBC broadcaster

References

Secondary schools in Shropshire
Schools in Shrewsbury
Academies in Shropshire